Gonçalo António da Silva Ferreira Sampaio (29 March 1865 in São Gens de Calvos – 28 July 1937 in Porto) was a Portuguese botanist.

He studied mathematics at the University of Coimbra and chemistry, mineralogy and botany at the Polytechnic Academy of Porto. From 1890 he served as an assistant naturalist at the Polytechnic Academy. From 1912 to 1935 he was a professor of botany at the faculty of sciences of the University of Porto.

As a taxonomist he described around 50 new species of vascular plants, five new species of desmids and about 70 new taxa of lichens that included the genus Carlosia (family Caliciaceae). The mycological genus Sampaioa (Gonz. Frag., 1923; syn. Mycoglaena) commemorates his name.

Selected works 
 Estudos sobre a flora dos arredores do Porto. Gen. Spergularia, 1904 – Studies on the flora in the vicinity of Porto; genus Spergularia.
 "Rubus” portuguezes. Contribuções para o seu estudo, 1904 – Rubus native to Portugal.
 Contribuções para o estudo da flora portugueza; Epilobiaceae, 1906 – Contributions for the study of the Portuguese flora; Epilobiaceae.
 Notas criticas sobre a flora portugueza, 1906 – Critical notes involving Portuguese flora.
 Flora vascular de Odemira, 1909 – Vascular plants of Odemira.
 Manual da flora portugueza, 1909–14 – Manual of Portuguese flora.
 Estudos botanicos. Especies novas e nomes novos, 1912 – Botanical studies, new species and new names.
 Lista das espécies representadas no Herbário português, 1913 – List of species represented in the Portuguese Herbarium.
 Apêndice à lista das espécies representadas no Herbário português, 1914 – Appendix to the list of species represented in the Portuguese Herbarium.

References 

1865 births
1937 deaths
People from Póvoa de Lanhoso
University of Coimbra alumni
Academic staff of the University of Porto
19th-century Portuguese botanists
Lichenologists
Phycologists
University of Porto alumni
Portuguese taxonomists
20th-century Portuguese botanists